An Ordinary Man is a 2017 American drama thriller film written, directed and produced by Brad Silberling. It stars Ben Kingsley, Hera Hilmar and Peter Serafinowicz. Filmed in Belgrade, Serbia in 2015, it was screened at the Bari International Film Festival in April 2017 and picked up in February 2018 by Saban Films, who released it direct-to-video in June 2018.

Plot
A war criminal is hiding in plain sight in an unnamed Balkan country. He is wanted internationally for ethnic cleansing and war crimes, but his country pretends his whereabouts to be unknown despite international pressures to turn him in. A retinue of loyalists watches over him and ensures his safety as he goes about his life in a city where his face is well-known. He begins to form a relationship with his newly hired maid, Tanja, after he expresses loneliness to her. Initially treating her abusively, he gradually forms an awkward friendship with her. She is later revealed to be an agent who is hired to protect him. She reluctantly drives him to the cemetery in his home village. His driver, who had been waiting for them, kills her on the spot, and drives the General back to his apartment in the city. The last scene shows him awaiting his arrest, seated at his kitchen table, with a handgun and bullets laid out in front of him.

The character of the General is based on Ratko Mladić, who was ultimately sentenced to life in prison for war crimes committed in the Bosnian war.

Cast 
 Ben Kingsley as The General
 Hera Hilmar as Tanja
 Peter Serafinowicz as Miro
 Robert Blythe as Grocer

Reception
On review aggregator website Rotten Tomatoes, the film holds an approval rating of 41%, based on 22 reviews, and an average rating  of 4.9/10.

References

External links 

An Ordinary Man at Rotten Tomatoes

2017 films
2017 thriller drama films
American thriller drama films
Films about mass murder
Films about murderers
Films about war crimes
Films directed by Brad Silberling
Films with screenplays by Brad Silberling
Films scored by Christophe Beck
Films shot in Serbia
Films set in Serbia
Films set in Belgrade
Films shot in Belgrade
Cultural depictions of Ratko Mladić
2017 drama films
2010s English-language films
2010s American films